The team eventing equestrian event at the 2011 Pan American Games was between October 21 and 23 at the Hipica Club (dressage and jumping competition) and the Santa Sofia Golf Club (cross country competition) in Guadalajara. The defending Pan American champion is the team from the United States.

Team eventing consisted of three phases: dressage, cross-country, and show-jumping. Scores from each phase were converted into penalty points, which were summed to give a score. Teams of up to five horse and rider pairs competed; for each team, the best three scores in each phase counted towards the team score.

In the dressage portion, the pair performed in front of three judges. The judges gave marks of between 0 and 10 for each of ten required elements; the scores for the judges were averaged to give a score between 0 and 100. That score was then subtracted from 100 and multiplied by 1.5 to give the number of penalty points.

The cross-county portion consisted of a 5.225 kilometer course with 30 efforts including 17 obstacles. The target time was nine and a half minutes; pairs received .4 penalty points for every second above that time. They also received 20 penalty points for every obstacle not cleanly jumped.  Riders did not complete the course in under nineteen minutes were eliminated and given a score of 1000 penalty points.

The final phase was the show-jumping; pairs had to negotiate a course of obstacles. The pair received 4 penalty points for each obstacle at which there was a refusal or a knockdown of the obstacle. One penalty point was also assessed for each second taken above the maximum time for the course.

In addition, 1000 points are given to any rider that did not complete a competition.  This includes withdraing/not-starting (WD), retiring during the competition (RD) or being eliminated in the cross county event (EL).

The results of the team phase were also used in the individual eventing event, though that event added a second jumping phase as a final.

Schedule
All times are Central Standard Time (UTC-6).

Results

Dressage

Cross country

Show jumping

References

Equestrian at the 2011 Pan American Games